The Black Gilliflower is an apple cultivar also called simply 'Gilliflower', believed to have originated in the US in the 18th century.

References

Apple cultivars